Coorabakh is a national park located near Hannam Vale in New South Wales, Australia,  northeast of Sydney.

Three volcanic outcrops known as Big Nellie, Flat Nellie and Little Nellie dominate the park.

The park is covered in tall eucalypt forest and shrubs on the exposed Lansdowne escarpment, while warm temperate and subtropical rainforest can be found in more protected areas.  Endangered species such as the spotted-tailed quoll, powerful owl and stuttering frog can be found in the area.

Newbys Cave is can be reached by following Newbys Creek from the carpark, while Newbys Lookout offers picnic facilities and panoramic views of the Manning River valley. Flat Rock Lookout overlooks the upper Lansdowne Valley and Comboyne Plateau escarpment. Starrs Creek picnic area has a rainforest viewing platform.

The park borders the Lansdowne State Forest.

Before the arrival of the Europeans, this area belonged to the Ngaamba people.

See also
 Protected areas of New South Wales
 Coopernook, New South Wales

References

External links
Coorabakh National Park

National parks of New South Wales
Protected areas established in 1999
1999 establishments in Australia